Deal Wyatt Hudson (born November 20, 1949) is an American conservative political activist.

Hudson is the former publisher and editor of Crisis Magazine and InsideCatholic.com.  He is currently president of the Morley Institute for Church and Culture. Hudson also hosts the radio show Church and Culture on Ave Maria Radio  and serves as publisher and editor of The Christian Review.

Hudson is the former Chairman and founder of Catholic Advocate. In September, 2020, Hudson was named a Senior Fellow of the Albertus Magnus Institute in Sacramento, California.

Life 
Hudson was born in Denver, Colorado.  college at the University of Texas-Austin, but converted to Catholicism in 1984. He discusses this conversion in his memoir, An American Conversion.

In 1980, Hudson became a lecturer in philosophy at Mercer University. Raised as a Protestant, Hudson became a Southern Baptist while attending college, converted to Catholicism in 1984.

In 1989, Hudson became a professor at Fordham University. In 1994, Cara Poppas accused Hudson of initiating a sexual encounter with her when she was an 18 year old Freshman at Fordham.  Hudson admitted his guilt and resigned from his tenured position at Fordham. In 1996 he paid a $30,000 settlement with Poppas to end a lawsuit.

In 1995 Hudson became publisher of the conservative Roman Catholic magazine, Crisis. Johnson also served as director of Catholic Outreach for President George W. Bush's 2000 and 2004 US presidential campaigns.

Hudson has written, edited or contributed to several books.  In 2004, he wrote the online guide "How to Vote Catholic". Hudson has written for the Los Angeles Times,  Slate. The Wall Street Journal and the Spectator. Among Hudson's activities outside politics is his sponsorship of an annual poetry luncheon at the beginning of Advent each Christmas season.

Hudson is credited with creating an outreach to Catholic voters in the 2016 presidential campaign of Donald Trump.

See also 
Religion and politics in the 2008 U.S. presidential campaign

Publications 
Understanding Maritain (ed. with Matthew J. Mancini). Mercer University Press, 1987 
The Future of Thomism: The Maritain Sequence (ed. with Dennis William Moran). University of Notre Dame Press, 1992 
Sigrid Undset: On Saints and Sinners (ed.) Ignatius Press, 1994 
Happiness and the Limits of Satisfaction. Rowman & Littlefield, 1995 ; PB 
Public Catholicism: The Challenge of Living the Faith in a Secular American Culture (contributor). Our Sunday Visitor, 1996 
An American Conversion: One Man's Discovery of Beauty and Truth in Times of Crisis. Crossroad, 2003 
Onward, Christian Soldiers: The Growing Political Power of Catholics and Evangelicals in the United States. Simon & Schuster, 2008 ; PB, 2010 
"Issues for Catholic Voters, 2012 Edition". Coauthored with Matt Smith. Amazon Digital Services, 2012 ASIN: B0076RXG42
How to Keep From Losing Your Mind: Educating Yourself Classically to Resist Cultural Indoctrination. TAN Books, 2019, HB, ; E-Book, 978-1505113525.
365 Days of Catholic Wisdom: A Treasure of Truth, Beauty, and Goodness. TAN Books, 2020, HB, October 8, 2020 <ref>https://tanbooks.com/catholic-tradition/church-teachings/365-days-of-catholic-wisdom-a-treasury-of-truth-beauty-and-goodness/ref> 
The Desecrators: Defeating the Cancel Culture Mod and Reclaiming One Nation Under God. Co-authored with Matt Schlapp. TAN Book, 2022, HB, February 22, 2022 <ref>https://tanbooks.com/contemporary-issues/social-issues/the-desecrators-defeating-the-cancel-culture-mob-and-reclaiming-one-nation-under-god//ref>

References

External links 

The Christian Review home page
Church and Culture home page
Dozens of Hudson's articles archived on CatholiCity.com
Personal homepage

1949 births
American publishers (people)
American Roman Catholic religious writers
Converts to Roman Catholicism
Fordham University faculty
Living people
People from Fairfax, Virginia
People from Fort Worth, Texas
University of Texas at Austin alumni
Virginia Republicans
Catholics from Virginia
Catholics from Texas